Kurt Adler (March 1, 1907September 21, 1977) was an Austrian classical chorus master, music conductor, author and pianist. He was best known as the chorus master and lead conductor of the Metropolitan Opera in New York City from 1943 to 1973.  He conducted in Austria, Germany, Russia, Czechoslovakia, Ukraine, United States, Canada, Mexico, Yugoslavia, Romania, Bulgaria and Hungary.

Early life
Kurt Adler was born in Jindřichův Hradec/Neuhaus, Bohemia (now Czech Republic), during the Austro-Hungarian Empire to a bourgeois Jewish family. He was the only child of Siegfried Adler (born June 26, 1876 in Luka u Jihlavy, Bohemia), a textile factory owner, and Olga (Fürth) Adler (born April 3, 1882 in Sušice/Schüttenhofen, Bohemia (now Czech Republic). Both parents were murdered by the Gestapo during World War II, after they were deported in 1942, from Vienna, Austria, to Izbica concentration camp, which served as a transfer camp, to the Bełżec extermination camp in Poland on May 15, 1942. His paternal grandparents, Jakob and Eveline Adler are buried in Neuhaus (now Jindřichův Hradec), Hebrew Cemetery. His maternal grandparents, Albert and Katherine Fürth are buried in Sušice (Schüttenhofen), Bohemia (now Czech Republic).

During the 1930s many now-famous musicians, including Adler, emigrated to the United States to escape from Nazism. Adler left for the United States on October 9, 1938. He sailed from Rotterdam, Holland in 1938 on the "SS Statendam".  The ship was later destroyed in the Rotterdam Blitz. He was naturalized on March 21, 1944.

Education
Kurt Adler began studying music at age six under cantor Jacob Fürnberg, Neuhaus), His first public appearance was at age fourteen.

His entire musical education was in Vienna, Austria. Other teachers include Prof. Richard Robert, Fanny Boehm-Kramer, Prof. Alexander Manhart (1875–1936) (piano); Prof. Karl Weigl (1881–1949), Prof. Guido Adler (1855–1941), Prof. Wilhelm Fischer (1886–1962) (theory); Prof. Ferdinand Foll (1867–1929), also Hermann Weigert (1890–1955), Erich Kleiber (1890–1956) (conducting). In 1925, he graduated from the classical Akademisches Gymnasium, Vienna. In 1927, he earned a degree of Musicology from the University of Vienna, corresponding to Master of Arts, Philosophical Faculty of the University of Vienna.

Life in the arts and humanities
Kurt Adler began his professional career in Germany on the musical staff of the Berlin State Opera. He later associated with the famous German Opera Theatre in Prague (where Rudolf, Szell and Schick also served) and with the Municipal Opera House in Berlin. He joined the Metropolitan Opera in 1943, under the management of Edward Johnson then in conjunction with Rudolf Bing, General Manager, from 1945 to 1973.

Maestro Adler's press announcement upon his recruitment as Chorus Master of the Metropolitan Opera in New York City said, "That since Giulio Setti's time, ten years ago, there never has been a single Chorus Master for the entire Italian, French, German, English repertoire and with my appointment, the gradual reorganization and training will again be centralized in one hand."

Languages
English, German, Czech, Russian, French, Italian, Spanish, Latin, Greek, Romanian, Yiddish, Hebrew.

Engagements

 1927–29     Assistant Conductor, Berlin State Opera. First opera conducted, Peer Gynt (Grieg).
 1929–32     Conductor, Prague German Opera Theater.
 1932–33     Conductor, Berlin Municipal Opera House.
 1933–38     Conducting symphony concerts and opera all over Europe.
 1933        Conductor of orchestral concerts, Vienna Grosser Musikvereinssaal.
 1933        Founder of the Unio Opera Company, Vienna.
 1933–35     First Conductor, Kiev, National Opera House of Ukraine.
 1935–37     Founder, Musical Director, and first conductor of the Symphonic Orchestra Stalingrad (U.S.S.R.).
 1938–43     U.S.A. Conducting concerts and concertizing as pianist all over U.S. and Canada.
 1938–39     Pianist, three transcontinental tours of the United States.
 1939–41     Musical Director, Friendship House, New York City.
 1943        Assistant Conductor to Leopold Stokowski, Metropolitan Opera, New York City.
 1943–73     Chorus Master, Conductor, Metropolitan Opera, New York City, New York (USA).
 1944–47     Musical Director, Opera Nacional and Opera de Mexico, Mexico City.
 1952        Musical Director, Central City Opera Festival, Central City, Colorado.
 1954        Musical Director of opera performances at Greek Theatre, Hollywood, California.
Conductor of numerous broadcasts and television performances of operatic and symphonic music.

Teaching positions
 1929–32     Organizer and Conductor of the Students Orchestra of the German Academy of Music (Deutsche Akademie für Musik und darstellende Kunst in Prag), Prague, Czechoslovakia.
 1934–35     Conductor, orchestra of the Kiev Conservatory of Music, Kiev (Ukraine).
 1935–37     Professor of the Opera class at the Conservatory of Music, Stalingrad (U.S.S.R.)
 1938–41     Teacher of piano, theory; classes in chamber music; coach; New York City.

Quotes
 Asked, "What do you consider your outstanding achievement?" Response, "Having escaped Hitler, having founded and directed the first Symphonic Orchestra Stalingrad." Asked, "What has helped you most in your career?" Response, "Artistic honesty, sense of humor, treatment of fellow artists (singers, chorus, orchestra) with utmost consideration for their values as human beings." Asked, "What has been your most thrilling musical experience?" Response, "First time when I heard Toscanini conduct with the Scala in 1928." Asked, "If you hadn't chosen your present career what would your second choice be?" Response, "would not have talent for anything else." Asked, "Are most of your friends musicians?" Response, "all kinds of intellectuals."
 "Many instrumentalists and singers insist on putting themselves into the foreground. Yet though they may be strong personalities or have complete mastery of their medium, still I would not call them real artists. A real artist must be humble. Vanity has been the core of many virtuoso careers but it also has been the end of genuine artistic growth. Psychologically, an accompanist and coach must try to search for and understand where the roots of his soloist's artistry lie. These roots are as varied as the individual artists. Faith – religious, metaphysical, or materialistic – is one of the strongest roots; faith in oneself is part of it. Some great artists – Richard Wagner, for instance – were extremely self-centered, compensating for this fault by preaching altruism in their works. This brings us to another root of artistry: compensation for shortcomings in one's makeup – atonement for real or imagined sins and errors. A third very important root is rebellion against family, upbringing, or an adverse fate. Among those who rebel are some of our greatest artists, who have become what they are by surmounting seemingly overwhelming odds. Complacency is not a good stimulus to artistry."
 "In your world of rapidly changing values – welcome changes when they are the results of technical and scientific progress – spiritual, ethical, and artistic values tend likewise to change, but much more slowly, and not always for the better. What the future will bring, no one can say. I should like to venture the opinion that the vistas opening for us will render us more humble, more concerned with inner or spiritual values. Our technological advances should give us more time; we shall need culture and be able to afford it."

Publications
 1943 Adler, K.: Songs of many wars, from the sixteenth to the twentieth century. New York, Howell, Soskin 1943, 221p. Edited and arranged by Kurt Adler. (A collection of fighting songs which oppressed people of all times and nation have sung in their fight against tyranny.)
 1953–1956 Adler, K.: Operatic anthology: celebrated arias selected from operas by old and modern composers, in five volumes / compiled by Kurt Adler. New York, G. Schirmer c1953–1956. Edited and arranged by Kurt Adler.
 1955 Adler, K.: Famous operatic choruses. New York, G. Schirmer c1955, Edited and arranged by Kurt Adler.
 1956 Adler, K.: The Prima donna‘s album: 42 celebrated arias from famous operas. New York, G. Schirmer c1956, Edited and arranged by Kurt Adler.
 1960 Adler, K.: Songs From Light Operas for soprano. New York, G. Schirmer 1960, Edited and arranged by Kurt Adler.
 1965 Adler, K.: The art of accompanying and coaching. Minneapolis, University of Minnesota Press 1965.
 1967Adler, K.: Phonetics and diction in singing: Italian, French, Spanish, German. Minneapolis, University of Minnesota Press 1967.
 1968 Adler, K.: Duets from the great operas, for soprano and baritone. New York, G. Schirmer 1968, Edited and arranged by Kurt Adler.
 1968 Adler, K.: Duets from the great operas, for soprano and tenor. New York, G. Schirmer, Edited and arranged by Kurt Adler.
 1971 Adler, K.: The art of accompanying and coaching. New York, Da Capo Press 
 1974 Adler, K.: Phonetics and diction in singing: Italian, French, Spanish, German. Minneapolis, University of Minnesota Press, 2nd ed.
 1975–1977 Adler, K.: Operatic anthology: celebrated arias selected from operas by old and modern composers, in five volumes / Edited and arranged by Kurt Adler. Rochester, N.Y., National Braille Association 1975–1977.
 1976 Adler, K.: The art of accompanying and coaching. New York, Da Capo Press 
 1980 Adler, K.: The art of accompanying and coaching. New York, Da Capo Press 
 1985 Adler, K.: The art of accompanying and coaching. New York, Da Capo Press

Personal life

On March 10, 1948, Adler married Irene Hawthorne (1917–1986) (birth name Irene McNutt), former prima ballerina soloist of the Metropolitan Opera.

On September 16, 1965, Adler married Christiane Tocco. One daughter: Eveline 

On September 21, 1977, Adler died at home in his sleep, in Butler, New Jersey, of uremia/chronic glomerulonephritis.

His hobbies included stamp and book collecting.

His athletics included soccer, field hockey (All Austrian 1926), Track and Field, swimming, tennis, and ping-pong.

His instruments were piano, organ, harmonica, harpsichord, and celeste

Bibliography 
 2009 Václav Urban: Kurt Adler. Ein leben für die Musik. Aus dem Tschechischen übertragen, herausgegeben und mit Ergänzungen versehen von Hana Pfalzová. ConBrio Verlagsgesellschaft, Regensburg 2009.  (104 p.) 
 2007 Václav Urban: Kurt Adler (1907 Neuhaus – 1977 New York). 1. vyd., Jindřichův Hradec, Kostelní Radouň, 2007, 140 p., 
 2000 Baker's Biographical Dictionary of Musicians, Centennial Edition. New York: Schirmer Reference, 2000, p. 21,  (set),  (vol. 1)
 1997 Rudolf M. Wlaschek: Biographia Judaica Bohemiae, 2 vol., Dortmund: Forschungsstelle Ostmitteleuropa, 1997, 75 S., 
 1995 Walter Pass, Gerhard Scheit, Wilhelm Svoboda: Orpheus im Exil – Die Vertreibung der österreichischen Musik von 1938 bis 1945, Wien: Verlag fur Gesellschaftskritik, 1995, 409 p., 
 1989 Alain Pâris: Dictionnaire des interprètes et de l'interprétation musicale au XXe siècle, Paris: Éditions Robert Laffont, 1989. 906 p., 
 1982 John L. Holmes: Conductors on record, London: Victor Gollancz, 1982, 734 p., 
 1979 Index to music necrology: supplement to the 1977 necrology, Notes (Music Library Association), 1979, 
 1978 "Kurt Adler – obituary", in: Opera News, Feb 4, 1978, p. 30
 1976 Paul Frank, Burchard Bulling, Florian Noetzel, Helmut Rosner: Kurzgefasstes Tonkünstler Lexikon – Zweiter Teil: Ergänzungen und Erweiterungen seit 1937, 15. Aufl., Wilhelmshaven: Heinrichshofen, volume 1: A-K. 1974. ; Bvolume 2: L-Z. 1976. 
 1969 One of the props, in: Opera News, Jan 25, 1969, p. 26–27
 1951 J.T.H. Mize: The international who is who in music, Fifth (Mid-Century) Edition, Chicago: Who is Who in Music, 1951.

References

External links
 Czech home page of Kurt Adler
 E-book about Kurt Adler in Czech (PDF, 29 MB)
 Place a picture of Adler's grandparents tomb stone in Neuhaus, Czech Republic
 METOPERA DATABASE – The Metropolitan Opera Archives Multi-field search – Adler, Kurt
 www.yadvashem.org Search – Adler, Siegfried and Adler, Olga
 Dokumentationsarchiv des österreichischen Widerstandes Search – Adler, Siegfried and Adler, Olga

1907 births
1977 deaths
Classical accompanists
American classical pianists
American male classical pianists
American male conductors (music)
Austrian classical pianists
Austrian conductors (music)
Male conductors (music)
Austrian Jews
Conductors of the Metropolitan Opera
Czech conductors (music)
Czech Jews
Jewish American classical musicians
Jewish classical pianists
Music directors (opera)
People from Jindřichův Hradec
People from Butler, New Jersey
Jewish emigrants from Austria to the United States after the Anschluss
20th-century classical pianists
American philatelists
20th-century American pianists
20th-century American conductors (music)
20th-century American male musicians
20th-century American Jews